Friends of the Israel Defense Forces (FIDF) (in ) is a non-political, non-military organization that works closely with the Israel Defense Forces (IDF) to provide for the well-being of its soldiers, veterans and family members. Established in 1981 by a group of Holocaust survivors, FIDF is a 501C3 not-for-profit corporation that operates 24 chapters across the United States with headquarters in New York City. It is the single organization authorized to collect charitable donations on behalf of the IDF in the United States, as designated by Lt. Gen. Gadi Eisenkot, IDF Chief of the General Staff, in March 2017, and by Lt. Gen. Aviv Kochavi, IDF Chief of the General Staff, in February 2019 and April 2021.

FIDF is wholeheartedly committed to caring, supporting, and providing better everyday lives and brighter futures for the courageous men and women of the IDF who protect Israel and Jews worldwide. For over forty years, FIDF programs have transformed countless young lives through many empowering educational, ﬁnancial, well-being, and cultural initiatives.

Programs 

FINANCIAL SUPPORT

FIDF funds programs for combat soldiers aimed at alleviating financial stress, economic insecurity, or distraction, allowing their minds to focus entirely on the complex military missions at hand. Other programs target the individual financial needs of specific units, while providing meaningful direct contact between soldiers and their unit's donors. 

 Adopt a Brigade: The Adopt a Brigade program personally connects a donor with a brigade of choice to provide critical support to the entire brigade. For a full brigade, typically comprising 2,000 to 4,000 soldiers, donors care for the welfare needs of its soldiers through food vouchers and direct grants, and care for the emotional well-being of its soldiers through a commander discretionary fund.
 Adopt a Battalion: The Adopt a Battalion program benefits a single battalion of choice comprising approximately 350 soldiers with funds dedicated to both their financial welfare and their emotional well-being. The program offers donors a unique opportunity to develop meaningful relationships with the adopted soldiers.
 Personal Necessities Vouchers: Food vouchers for the purchase of food and other necessities address the acute financial distress of soldiers living below the poverty line, as well as Lone Soldiers who lack familial support. These vouchers can be redeemed at supermarkets, pharmacies, and military grocery stores. Soldiers from families who live just above the poverty line qualify for Gray Zone vouchers.
 Spirit: The Spirit program offers combat units and their commanders a break from their stressful duties in the form of a comprehensive week-long motivational program of education and fellowship. Designed to rejuvenate their morale and develop comradery, the program connects the soldiers to each other and their mission.  

EDUCATION

FIDF’s Education programs give soldiers the necessary tools to reach their full potential, providing for a successful continuum from high school to higher education and into the job market. FIDF’s market-leading IMPACT! scholarship program matches donors with combat or combat-support veterans to grant them with full four-year academic scholarships.

 IMPACT! Scholarships: The IMPACT! Scholarship program pairs donors with former combat and combat support soldiers from economically disadvantaged backgrounds to sponsor their higher education with a full four-year scholarship and all living expenses covered.
 Formal Education: Boasting an incredible 95% success rate, the Formal Education program is a four to five-month course that enables soldiers to receive a high school diploma, ensuring that all Israeli teens are given the opportunity to serve in the IDF, meet their potential, and set their course for a successful future.
 Project Overcome: Project Overcome enables those who were historically considered “unfit for service,” due to criminal records, addiction, or other behavioral problems, to enlist and gain crucial skills that will help them throughout their service and set them on a path to becoming citizens who positively contribute to Israeli society.
 Mamriot – Cyber and Technology Training: Mamriot is a unique initiative aimed at closing the gender gap in high-tech units of the IDF by offering early cyber and tech training to teenage girls, half of whom are from disadvantaged communities, eventually serving as a springboard into high-tech careers.
 Momentum – Re-Entry into Civilian Life: Momentum provides soldiers with the fundamental tools, skills, and information they need to return to civilian life. Additional seminars are offered to combat soldiers to process their experiences and further prepare them for civilian re-entry.
 Professional Training: The Professional Training program provides combat soldiers with hands-on training for an array of vocational career paths in the private sector.
 Spectrum of Talent: This program opens the IDF's doors to soldiers on the autistic spectrum. In this special track soldiers with autism spend six weeks with specialized mentors who help them integrate into military life and accompany them throughout their service.

LONE SOLDIER SUPPORT

Lone Soldier programs offer support to 7,000 young men and women actively serving in the Israel Defense Forces with no immediate family in Israel to rely upon. About half come from Israel, sometimes orphans or from broken homes, and the other half volunteer from abroad with distance between them and their families. FIDF provides these young soldiers with practical and emotional support throughout their service.

 Social & Emotional Support: In partnership with Nefesh B’Nefesh, FIDF’s Lone Soldiers program includes a 24-hour call center, advocacy with government agencies, social gatherings such as holiday meals and Errands Day, and more. The program also provides valuable support and connections for the parents of Lone Soldiers.
 Financial Assistance: Together with Nefesh B’Nefesh, FIDF provides Lone Soldiers with a small financial safety net for the beginning of their service to help them comfortably settle in their new roles. During their service FIDF distributes holiday gift vouchers to celebrate without the financial support of their families.
 Flights Home: Through one of its most heartwarming programs, FIDF provides Lone Soldiers with flights home, reuniting them with cherished family and friends during their service.
 Fun Day: Once a year, FIDF sponsors a Fun Day for Lone Soldiers at a waterpark to ease loneliness as Lone Soldiers connect with others who relate to their experiences.
 Warm Homes: The Warm Home program provides Lone Soldiers with state-of-the-art housing throughout their service. 

WOUNDED SOLDIER & BEREAVED FAMILY SUPPORT

FIDF ensures that IDF soldiers who have suffered lifelong injuries or losses to protect the State of Israel can continue to live a high quality of life. Our programs offer care to those who need it most. Whether physical or psychological wounds, FIDF assists with their recoveries every step of the way, strengthening their mental and physical capabilities and providing the support they need to find happiness. The Bereaved Families program offers financial, therapeutic, and emotional support to families of the fallen.

 Wounded Soldiers: Wounded Solders program ensures that IDF soldiers who have suffered a wound, injury, or trauma during service can continue to live a high quality of life through support in their recovery process and access to cutting-edge solutions such as advanced medical and technological rehabilitation equipment, service and therapy dogs, emotional support, and financial support.
 Bereaved Family Retreats: Bereaved Family Retreats provide families of fallen soldiers the opportunity to heal, rebuild, and bond with other bereaved families as they embark on the challenge of rebuilding their future
 Legacy Summer Camps: Legacy Summer Camps sponsor B’nai Mitzvah-age siblings and children of fallen soldiers to attend a summer camp in the United States, giving them the opportunity to heal and bond with other children who have faced similar losses.
 Unity Race: Each year, FIDF sponsors and special running race that honors the brave Druze soldiers who lost their lives protecting Israel.

SPIRITUAL & HERITAGE PROGRAMS

Spiritual Support and Heritage Tours provide IDF soldiers with important intellectual, spiritual, and emotional support as they inevitably encounter, day-to-day, deep-rooted universal questions of identity, purpose, and ethics during the course of their challenging service.

 Rosh Hashanah Vouchers: For soldiers in financial need who qualify, FIDF provides cash holiday vouchers that enable them to meaningfully celebrate holidays with their loved ones.
 Nativ – Jewish Identity: Nativ enlightens soldiers about their own rich past, giving context for their service and helping them to better understand their place in the history. Soldiers learn and explore Jewish texts, values, history and philosophy, and travel Israel to connect with the land and culture.
 Jewish Awareness: A variety of programs offer deep immersion into local history and culture. The Mahut program offers a select delegation of soldiers and commanders to partake in a seven-day, life-changing, learning expedition of trips and workshops that focuses on Jewish values and identity. Selichot Tours engage and enlighten participants on a magical tour of Jerusalem. Lastly, through workshops, lectures, and visits to historical sites as part of the Footsteps of the Maccabees Tour, IDF commanders and soldiers travel across Israel during Chanukah, following in the footsteps of the Maccabees.
 Spiritual Items: FIDF ensures that soldiers have everything they need for religious observance and celebration such as tefillin, tziziyot, mezuzot, Esther scrolls, menorahs, and text books.
 Witnesses in Uniform: The Witnesses in Uniform program assembles annual delegations of deserving officers and commanders from every branch of the IDF to partake in an enlightening series of historical immersion experiences focusing on the atrocities of the Holocaust.

Construction Projects 
FIDF’s construction projects give the soldiers of the IDF a taste of “home away from home” while in service. FIDF creates environments where soldiers can relax, connect with each other, stay in shape, and simply feel like themselves again. Projects range from individual structures to comprehensive well-being complexes, and include recreation and sports centers, cultural and educational facilities, synagogues, auditoriums, and soldier homes.

Missions to Israel 

FIDF missions provide a unique opportunity to travel together with the soldiers who are protecting the very land that is being visited. Participants gain a unique perspective and extraordinary, exclusive access to people and places normally off-limits. They go behind-the-scenes to tour IDF bases and personally meet with top officials and dignitaries. 

Chairman’s Leadership Mission

FIDF’s leadership runs an annual mission that provides a truly insider’s view of the IDF. Participants spend quality time with the officials and soldiers tasked with the precious role of guarding the Jewish homeland.

From Holocaust to Independence: Mission to Poland and Israel

This unforgettable, uniquely FIDF mission brings Jewish history to life. The delegates begin the trip in Poland with visits to sites such as the Auschwitz-Birkenau camps and then fly to Israel on an Israeli Air Force plane where they experience the elation of Yom Ha’atzmaut in Israel with IDF soldiers.

FIDF National Young Leadership Mission to Israel 

Each summer, young professionals from across the country for an exclusive opportunity to experience Israel alongside IDF soldiers. Participants visit IDF bases, walk the Old City of Jerusalem and the beaches of Tel Aviv, meet Israeli youth leaders, and hear from high ranking IDF commanders.

Young Leadership

FIDF’s National Young Leadership is a proud network of emerging leaders, change-makers, and social butterflies, ages 21-39, who aspire to be part of securing a bright future for Jews worldwide. With a presence spanning from coast to coast across the United States, thousands of young leaders gather regularly for blow-out parties and intimate gatherings alike. They enjoy inﬂuential and cutting-edge speakers, the hottest DJs, and experiences like no other, all with IDF soldiers and they raise significant funds to make a lasting impact for the young men and women of the IDF.

Mitzvah Projects

Friends of the Israel Defense Forces Mitzvah Projects allow Bar and Bat Mitzvah children to contribute to Israeli soldiers by supporting the Friends of the Israel Defense Forces program of their choice through making phone calls, starting an online campaign, sending emails, or hosting events.

Planned Giving
FIDF’s Planned Giving allows donors to realize their philanthropic goals while simultaneously securing the financial future and the future welfare of Israel’s soldiers. Planned giving options include gift annuities, charitable remainder trusts, bequests, endowments, and other planned gifts.

Organization
In addition to its national headquarters in New York and its office in Israel, Friends of the Israel Defense Forces has 5 regional offices and 25 chapters in the United States.

Accreditations
FIDF has consistently received the highest ratings for accountability and transparency from two of the leading independent charity evaluators: Charity Navigator and Charity Watch. FIDF received the highest 4-star rating from Charity Navigator for the 11th year in a row now—a feat accomplished by only 2% of charities in America, and Charity Watch has bestowed FIDF with their “Top-Rated” seal.

“Based on the most recent information available, we have issued a new rating for your organization. We are proud to announce Friends of the Israel Defense Forces has earned our ninth consecutive 4-star rating. This is our highest possible rating and indicates that your organization adheres to sector best practices and executes its mission in a financially efficient way. Attaining a 4-star rating verifies that Friends of the Israel Defense Forces exceeds industry standards and outperforms most charities in your area of work. Only 2% of the charities we evaluate have received at least 9 consecutive 4-star evaluations, indicating that Friends of the Israel Defense Forces outperforms most other charities in America. This exceptional designation from Charity Navigator sets Friends of the Israel Defense Forces apart from its peers and demonstrates to the public its trustworthiness.” – Michael Thatcher, President and CEO of Charity Navigator

Fundraising
Friends of the Israel Defense Forces collects tax-deductible donations through a variety of fundraising efforts, including community events, online activity, concerts, missions to Israel, and small-scale parlor meetings. Many high-level Israeli and American officials and cultural icons have spoken and participated at Friends of the Israel Defense Forces' gala dinners, including:
Israel Defense Forces' Chief of the General Staff, Lt. Gen. Benjamin (Benny) Gantz
Former Minister of Defense Ehud Barak
Former Israel Defense Forces' Chief of the General Staff Lt. Gen.Gabi Ashkenazi
Former Minister of Defense Moshe Ya'alon
Prime Minister of Israel Benjamin Netanyahu
Israeli President Reuven Rivlin
 Former New York Mayor Michael Bloomberg 
 Former Israeli Ambassador Daniel Ayalon 
 Actor Jason Alexander
 Music producer David Foster 
 Actress-singer Barbra Streisand
 Haim Saban 
 Benny Shabtai
 Simon Cowell 
 Lionel Richie 
 Macy Gray
 A. J. McLean
 Michael Dell
 Steve Tisch
 Sheldon Adelson
 Maurice and Paul Marciano
 Larry Ellison
 Monica Crowley
 Pamela Anderson
 Sylvester Stallone
 Arnold Schwarzenegger
 Chris Tucker
 Avi Arad
 Ben Silverman
 Alan Horn
 Barry Meyer
 Vivi Nevo
 Spencer Hawes

References

External links
Official site

1981 establishments in New York (state)
Charities based in New York City
Israel Defense Forces
Jewish charities based in the United States
Foreign charities operating in Israel
Zionist organizations